Davide Bianchetti (born March 8, 1977 in Brescia) is a professional squash player who represents Italy. He reached a career-high world ranking of World No. 24 in October 2004.

References

External links 
 
 

Italian male squash players
Living people
1977 births
Sportspeople from Brescia